The 1993–94 Austrian Hockey League season was the 64th season of the Austrian Hockey League, the top level of ice hockey in Austria. Four teams participated in the league, and VEU Feldkirch won the championship.

Regular season

Playoffs

Semifinals

Final

External links
Austrian Ice Hockey Association

Austrian Hockey League seasons
Aus
1993–94 in Austrian ice hockey leagues